Wesenberg Castle is a motte-and-bailey castle in Wesenberg, Mecklenburg-Vorpommern (Germany).

Of the original castle, only the bergfried tower and an adjacent part of the former ring wall survives. The castle was founded by Nicholas I of Werle during the middle of the 13th century, as protection for the city of Wesenberg. Among other things, the castle served as a residence for the widow of Duke Ulrich II of Mecklenburg-Stargard, Catherine. The castle was largely destroyed by a fire in 1630. Today, the castle is owned by the city of Wesenberg and since 1950 it houses the offices of the local forestry administration.

References

External links

Castles in Mecklenburg-Western Pomerania
Mecklenburgische Seenplatte (district)